Leonard Clark may refer to:

Leonard Clark (poet) (1905–1981), English poet and anthropologist
Leonard Clark (explorer) (1907–1957), American explorer, writer, and OSS colonel
Len Stockwell (Leonard Clark Stockwell, 1859–1905), American professional baseball player
Leonard Clark, Brisbane Lions player from the 2005 AFL draft
Leonard Clark, candidate for the Conservative party in the Birmingham City Council election, 2011
Leonard Clark, a character played by Tom Hollander in Paparazzi
Leonard Clark, a character played by Herb Vigran in an episode of the television series Dragnet